The 2014 Black Reel Awards, which annually recognize and celebrate the achievements of black people in feature, independent and television films, were announced on Thursday, February 13, 2014. Fruitvale Station, The Butler and 12 Years a Slave lead the film nominees with 9 nominations apiece. Pastor Brown, The Watsons Go to Birmingham and Being Mary Jane lead the television nominees with 6 nominations. This year saw the Breakthrough Performance category split between genders bringing this years total categories to 26.

12 Years a Slave made Black Reel Awards history by winning 8 awards including Outstanding Motion Picture. Multiple winning films included: Captain Phillips and 20 Feet from Stardom. On the television side, Mike Tyson: Undisputed Truth and Being Mary Jane tied for the most wins with two.

Multiple winners included: Steve McQueen, Lupita Nyong'o, Barkhad Abdi and Chiwetel Ejiofor.

Winners and nominees
Winners are listed first and highlighted in bold.

References

2014 in American cinema
2014 awards in the United States
Black Reel Awards 
2013 film awards